Vitamin E is a group of eight fat soluble compounds that include four tocopherols and four tocotrienols. Vitamin E deficiency, which is rare and usually due to an underlying problem with digesting dietary fat rather than from a diet low in vitamin E, can cause nerve problems. Vitamin E is a fat-soluble antioxidant which may help protect cell membranes from reactive oxygen species. Worldwide, government organizations recommend adults consume in the range of 3 to 15 mg per day. As of 2016, consumption was below recommendations according to a worldwide summary of more than one hundred studies that reported a median dietary intake of 6.2 mg per day for alpha-tocopherol. 

Population studies suggested that people who consumed foods with more vitamin E, or who chose on their own to consume a vitamin E dietary supplement, had lower incidence of cardiovascular diseases, cancer, dementia, and other diseases. However, placebo-controlled clinical trials using alpha-tocopherol as a supplement, with daily amounts as high as 2,000 mg per day, could not always replicate these findings. In the United States vitamin E supplement use peaked around 2002, but has declined by more than half by 2006. The authors theorized that declining use may have been due to publications of large placebo-controlled studies that showed either no benefits or actual negative consequences from high-dose vitamin E. 

There is use of vitamin E in skincare and wound-treatment products, but no clinical evidence that it is effective. 

Both natural and synthetic tocopherols are subject to oxidation, and so in dietary supplements are esterified, creating tocopheryl acetate for stability purposes. Tocopherols and tocotrienols both occur in α (alpha), β (beta), γ (gamma) and δ (delta) forms, as determined by the number and position of methyl groups on the chromanol ring. All eight of these vitamers feature a chromane double ring, with a hydroxyl group that can donate a hydrogen atom to reduce free radicals, and a hydrophobic side chain which allows for penetration into biological membranes. 

Vitamin E was discovered in 1922, isolated in 1935, and first synthesized in 1938. Because the vitamin activity was first identified as essential for fertilized eggs to result in live births (in rats), it was given the name "tocopherol" from Greek words meaning birth and to bear or carry. Alpha-tocopherol, either naturally extracted from plant oils or, most commonly, as the synthetic tocopheryl acetate, is sold as a popular dietary supplement, either by itself or incorporated into a multivitamin product, and in oils or lotions for use on skin.

Chemistry 

The nutritional content of vitamin E is defined by equivalency to 100% RRR-configuration α-tocopherol activity. The molecules that contribute α-tocopherol activity are four tocopherols and four tocotrienols, within each group of four identified by the prefixes alpha- (α-), beta- (β-), gamma- (γ-), and delta- (δ-). For alpha(α)-tocopherol each of the three "R" sites has a methyl group (CH3) attached. For beta(β)-tocopherol: R1 = methyl group, R2 = H, R3 = methyl group. For gamma(γ)-tocopherol: R1 = H, R2 = methyl group, R3 = methyl group. For delta(δ)-tocopherol: R1 = H, R2 = H, R3 = methyl group. The same configurations exist for the tocotrienols, except that the hydrophobic side chain has three carbon-carbon double bonds whereas the tocopherols have a saturated side chain.

Stereoisomers 
In addition to distinguishing tocopherols and tocotrienols by position of methyl groups, the tocopherols have a phytyl tail with three chiral points or centers that can have a right or left orientation. The naturally occurring plant form of alpha-tocopherol is RRR-α-tocopherol, also referred to as d-tocopherol, whereas the synthetic form (all-racemic or all-rac vitamin E, also dl-tocopherol) is equal parts of eight stereoisomers RRR, RRS, RSS, SSS, RSR, SRS, SRR and SSR with progressively decreasing biological equivalency, so that 1.36 mg of dl-tocopherol is considered equivalent to 1.0 mg of d-tocopherol, the natural form. Rephrased, the synthetic has 73.5% of the potency of the natural.

Tocopherols 
Alpha-tocopherol is a lipid-soluble antioxidant functioning within the glutathione peroxidase pathway, and protecting cell membranes from oxidation by reacting with lipid radicals produced in the lipid peroxidation chain reaction. This removes the free radical intermediates and prevents the oxidation reaction from continuing. The oxidized α-tocopheroxyl radicals produced in this process may be recycled back to the active reduced form through reduction by other antioxidants, such as ascorbate, retinol or ubiquinol. Other forms of vitamin E have their own unique properties; for example, γ-tocopherol is a nucleophile that can react with electrophilic mutagens.

Tocotrienols 
The four tocotrienols (alpha, beta, gamma, delta) are similar in structure to the four tocopherols, with the main difference being that the former have hydrophobic side chains with three carbon-carbon double bonds, whereas the tocopherols have saturated side chains. For alpha(α)-tocotrienol each of the three "R" sites has a methyl group (CH3) attached. For beta(β)-tocotrienol: R1 = methyl group, R2 = H, R3 = methyl group. For gamma(γ)-tocotrienol: R1 = H, R2 = methyl group, R3 = methyl group. For delta(δ)-tocotrienol: R1 = H, R2 = H, R3 = methyl group. Palm oil is a good source of alpha and gamma tocotrienols.

Tocotrienols have only a single chiral center, which exists at the 2' chromanol ring carbon, at the point where the isoprenoid tail joins the ring. The other two corresponding centers in the phytyl tail of the corresponding tocopherols do not exist as chiral centers for tocotrienols due to unsaturation (C-C double bonds) at these sites. Tocotrienols extracted from plants are always dextrorotatory stereoisomers, signified as d-tocotrienols. In theory, levorotatory forms of tocotrienols (l-tocotrienols) could exist as well, which would have a 2S rather than 2R configuration at the molecules' single chiral center, but unlike synthetic dl-alpha-tocopherol, the marketed tocotrienol dietary supplements are extracted from palm oil. A number of health benefits of tocotrienols have been proposed, included decreased risk of are-associated cognitive impairment, heart disease and cancer. The evidence is not conclusive.

Functions 

Vitamin E may have various roles as a vitamin. Many biological functions have been postulated, including a role as a fat-soluble antioxidant. In this role, vitamin E acts as a radical scavenger, delivering a hydrogen (H) atom to free radicals. At 323 kJ/mol, the O-H bond in tocopherols is about 10% weaker than in most other phenols. This weak bond allows the vitamin to donate a hydrogen atom to the peroxyl radical and other free radicals, minimizing their damaging effect. The thus-generated tocopheryl radical is recycled to tocopherol by a redox reaction with a hydrogen donor, such as vitamin C.

Vitamin E affects gene expression and is an enzyme activity regulator, such as for protein kinase C (PKC) – which plays a role in smooth muscle growth – with vitamin E participating in deactivation of PKC to inhibit smooth muscle growth.

Synthesis

Biosynthesis 
Photosynthesizing plants, algae and cyanobacteria synthesize tocochromanols, the chemical family of compounds made up of four tocopherols and four tocotrienols; in a nutrition context this family is referred to as Vitamin E. Biosynthesis starts with formation of the closed-ring part of the molecule as homogentisic acid (HGA). The side chain is attached (saturated for tocopherols, polyunsaturated for tocotrienols). The pathway for both is the same, so that gamma- is created and from that alpha-, or delta- is created and from that the beta- compounds. Biosynthesis takes place in the plastids.

As to why plants synthesize tocochromanols, the major reason appears to be for antioxidant activity. Different parts of plants, and different species, are dominated by different tocochromanols. The predominant form in leaves, and hence leafy green vegetables is α-tocopherol. Location is in chloroplast membranes, in close proximity to the photosynthetic process. The function is to protect against damage from the ultraviolet radiation of sunlight. Under normal growing conditions the presence of α-tocopherol does not appear to be essential, as there are other photo-protective compounds, and plants that through mutations have lost the ability to synthesize α-tocopherol demonstrate normal growth. However, under stressed growing conditions such as drought, elevated temperature or salt-induced oxidative stress, the plants' physiological status is superior if it has the normal synthesis capacity.

Seeds are lipid-rich, to provide energy for germination and early growth. Tocochromanols protect the seed lipids from oxidizing and becoming rancid. The presence of tocochromanols extends seed longevity, and promotes successful germination and seedling growth. Gamma-tocopherol dominates in seeds of most plant species, but there are exceptions. For canola, corn and soy bean oils, there is more γ-tocopherol than α-tocopherol, but for safflower, sunflower and olive oils the reverse is true. Of the commonly used food oils, palm oil is unique in that tocotrienol content is higher than tocopherol content. Seed tocochromanols content is also dependent on environmental stressors. In almonds, for example, drought or elevated temperature increase α-tocopherol and γ-tocopherol content of the nuts. The same article mentions that drought increases the tocopherol content of olives, and heat likewise for soybeans.

Vitamin E biosynthesis occurs in the plastid and goes through two different pathways: the Shikimate pathway and the Methylerythritol Phosphate pathway (MEP pathway).
The Shikimate pathway generates the chromanol ring from the Homogentisic Acid (HGA) and the MEP pathway produces the hydrophobic tail which differs between tocopherol and tocotrienol. The synthesis of the specific tail is dependent on which molecule it originates from. In a tocopherol, its prenyl tail emerges from the geranylgeranyl diphosphate (GGDP) group, while the phytyl tail of a tocotrienol stems from a phytyl diphosphate. 

Focusing on tocopherols, the synthesis of its derivatives stems from the reaction between the HGA and the Phytyl-PP which generates 2-Methyl-6-phytylhydroquinone. At this point of the synthesis, 2-Methyl-6-phytylhydroquinone can go through two different pathways. The first path takes the molecule and methylates it at C3. This results in a 2,3-Dimethyl-5-phytylhydroquinone. Then, the cyclization of the hydroxyl group at C1 generates the first derivative, γ-Tocopherol. Following the cyclization, another methylation is done at C5 of the γ-Tocopherol resulting in the production of α-Tocopherol. The second path takes the same 2-Methyl-6-phytylhydroquinone and cyclizes the hydroxyl group at C1 which produces the δ-Tocopherol. Afterward, a round of methylation at C5 results in the last derivative, β-Tocopherol. This whole synthesis occurs similarly for tocotrienol with prenyl-PP, which is generated from a GGDP group, replacing the phytyl-PP.

Industrial synthesis 
The synthetic product is all-rac-alpha-tocopherol, also referred to as dl-alpha tocopherol. It consists of eight stereoisomers (RRR, RRS,  RSS, RSR, SRR, SSR, SRS  and SSS) in equal quantities. "It is synthesized from a mixture of toluene and 2,3,5-trimethyl-hydroquinone that reacts with isophytol to all-rac-alpha-tocopherol, using iron in the presence of hydrogen chloride gas as catalyst. The reaction mixture obtained is filtered and extracted with aqueous caustic soda. Toluene is removed by evaporation and the residue (all rac-alpha-tocopherol) is purified by vacuum distillation." The synthetic is in contrast to what is extracted from plants, all RRR-alpha tocopherol, referred to as d-alpha-tocopherol. The synthetic has 73.5% of the potency of the natural. Manufacturers of dietary supplements and fortified foods for humans or domesticated animals convert the phenol form of the vitamin to an ester using either acetic acid or succinic acid because the esters are more chemically stable, providing for a longer shelf-life.</ref>

Deficiency 

Vitamin E deficiency is rare in humans, occurring as a consequence of abnormalities in dietary fat absorption or metabolism rather than from a diet low in vitamin E. One example of a genetic abnormality in metabolism is mutations of genes coding for alpha-tocopherol transfer protein (α-TTP). Humans with this genetic defect exhibit a progressive neurodegenerative disorder known as ataxia with vitamin E deficiency (AVED) despite consuming normal amounts of vitamin E. Large amounts of alpha-tocopherol as a dietary supplement are needed to compensate for the lack of α-TTP Vitamin E deficiency due to either malabsorption or metabolic anomaly can cause nerve problems due to poor conduction of electrical impulses along nerves due to changes in nerve membrane structure and function. In addition to ataxia, vitamin E deficiency can cause peripheral neuropathy, myopathies, retinopathy, and impairment of immune responses.

Drug interactions 
The amounts of alpha-tocopherol, other tocopherols and tocotrienols that are components of dietary vitamin E, when consumed from foods, do not appear to cause any interactions with drugs. Consumption of alpha-tocopherol as a dietary supplement in amounts in excess of 300 mg/day may lead to interactions with aspirin, warfarin and cyclosporine A in ways that alter function. For aspirin and warfarin, high amounts of vitamin E may potentiate anti-blood clotting action.  In multiple clinical trials, vitamin E lowered blood concentration of the immunosuppressant medication, cyclosporine A. The US National Institutes of Health, Office of Dietary Supplements, raises a concern that co-administration of vitamin E could counter the mechanisms of anti-cancer radiation therapy and some types of chemotherapy, and so advises against its use in these patient populations. The references it cited reported instances of reduced treatment adverse effects, but also poorer cancer survival, raising the possibility of tumor protection from the intended oxidative damage by the treatments.

Dietary recommendations 

The U.S. National Academy of Medicine updated estimated average requirements (EARs) and recommended dietary allowances (RDAs) for vitamin E in 2000. RDAs are higher than EARs so as to identify amounts that will cover people with higher than average requirements. Adequate intakes (AIs) are identified when there is not sufficient information to set EARs and RDAs. The EAR for vitamin E for women and men ages 14 and up is 12 mg/day. The RDA is 15 mg/day. As for safety, tolerable upper intake levels ("upper limits" or ULs) are set for vitamins and minerals when evidence is sufficient. Hemorrhagic effects in rats were selected as the critical endpoint to calculate the upper limit via starting with the lowest-observed-adverse-effect-level. The result was a human upper limit set at 1000 mg/day. Collectively the EARs, RDAs, AIs and ULs are referred to as Dietary Reference Intakes.

The European Food Safety Authority (EFSA) refers to the collective set of information as dietary reference values, with population reference intakes (PRIs) instead of RDAs, and average requirements instead of EARs. AIs and ULs are defined the same as in the United States. For women and men ages 10 and older, the PRIs are set at 11 and 13 mg/day, respectively. PRI for pregnancy is 11 mg/day, for lactation 11 mg/day. For children ages 1–9 years the PRIs increase with age from 6 to 9 mg/day. The EFSA used an effect on blood clotting as a safety-critical effect. It identified that no adverse effects were observed in a human trial as 540 mg/day, used an uncertainty factor of 2 to get to a suggest an upper limit of half of that, then rounded to 300 mg/day.

The Japan National Institute of Health and Nutrition set adult AIs at 6.5 mg/day (females) and 7.0 mg/day (males), and 650–700 mg/day (females), and 750–900 mg/day (males) for upper limits, amounts depending on age. India recommends an intake of 8–10 mg/day and does not set an upper limit. The World Health Organization recommends that adults consume 10 mg/day. The United Kingdom is an outlier, in that it recommends 4 mg/day for adult men and 3 mg/day for adult women. 

Consumption is below these government recommendations. Government survey results in the United States reported average consumption for adult females at 8.4 mg/d and adult males 10.4 mg/d. Both are below the RDA of 15 mg/day. A worldwide summary of more than one hundred studies reported a median dietary intake of 6.2 mg/d for alpha-tocopherol.

Food labeling 
For U.S. food and dietary supplement labeling purposes, the amount in a serving is expressed as a percent of daily value. For vitamin E labeling purposes 100% of the daily value was 30 international units, but as of 27 May 2016 it was revised to 15 mg to bring it into agreement with the RDA. Compliance with the updated labeling regulations was required by 1 January 2020 for manufacturers with US$10 million or more in annual food sales, and by 1 January 2021 for manufacturers with lower volume food sales. A table of the old and new adult daily values is provided at Reference Daily Intake.

European Union regulations require that labels declare energy, protein, fat, saturated fat, carbohydrates, sugars, and salt. Voluntary nutrients may be shown if present in significant amounts. Instead of daily values, amounts are shown as percent of reference intakes (RIs). For vitamin E, 100% RI was set at 12 mg in 2011.

The international unit measurement was used by the United States in 1968–2016. 1 IU is the biological equivalent of about 0.667 mg d (RRR)-alpha-tocopherol (2/3 mg exactly), or of 0.90 mg of dl-alpha-tocopherol, corresponding to the then-measured relative potency of stereoisomers. In May 2016, the measurements have been revised, such that 1 mg of "Vitamin E" is 1 mg of d-alpha-tocopherol or 2 mg of dl-alpha-tocopherol. The change was originally started in 2000, when forms of Vitamin E other than alpha-tocopherol was dropped from dietary  calculations by the IOM. The UL amount disregards any conversion. The EFSA has never used an IU unit, and their measurement only considers RRR-alpha-tocopherol.

Sources 
Worldwide, consumption is below recommendations according to a summary of more than one hundred studies that reported a median dietary intake of 6.2 mg per day for alpha-tocopherol. Of the many different forms of vitamin E, gamma-tocopherol (γ-tocopherol) is the most common form found in the North American diet, but alpha-tocopherol (α-tocopherol) is the most biologically active. Palm oil is a source of tocotrienols.

The U.S. Department of Agriculture (USDA), Agricultural Research Services, maintains a food composition database. The last major revision was Release 28, September 2015. In addition to the naturally occurring sources shown in the table, certain ready-to-eat cereals, infant formulas, liquid nutrition products and other foods are fortified with alpha-tocopherol.

Supplements 

Vitamin E is fat soluble, so dietary supplement products are usually in the form of the vitamin, esterified with acetic acid to generate tocopheryl acetate, and dissolved in vegetable oil in a softgel capsule. For alpha-tocopherol, amounts range from 100 to 1000 IU per serving. Smaller amounts are incorporated into multi-vitamin/mineral tablets. Gamma-tocopherol and tocotrienol supplements are also available from dietary supplement companies. The latter are extracts from palm oil.

Fortification 
The World Health Organization does not have any recommendations for food fortification with vitamin E. The Food Fortification Initiative does not list any countries that have mandatory or voluntary programs for vitamin E. Infant formulas have alpha-tocopherol as an ingredient. In some countries, certain brands of ready-to-eat cereals, liquid nutrition products and other foods have alpha-tocopherol as an added ingredient.

Non-nutrient food additives 
Various forms of vitamin E are common food additive in oily food, used to deter rancidity caused by peroxidation. Those with an E number include:
 E306 Tocopherol-rich extract (mixed, natural, can include tocotrienol)
 E307 Alpha-tocopherol (synthetic)
 E308 Gamma-tocopherol (synthetic)
 E309 Delta-tocopherol (synthetic)

These E numbers include all racemic forms and acetate esters thereof. Commonly found on food labels in Europe and some other countries, their safety assessment and approval are the responsibility of the European Food Safety Authority.

Metabolism 
Tocotrienols and tocopherols, the latter including the stereoisomers of synthetic alpha-tocopherol, are absorbed from the intestinal lumen, incorporated into chylomicrons, and secreted into the portal vein, leading to the liver. Absorption efficiency is estimated at 51% to 86%, and that applies to all of the vitamin E family – there is no discrimination among the vitamin E vitamers during absorption. Unabsorbed vitamin E is excreted via feces. Additionally, vitamin E is excreted by the liver via bile into the intestinal lumen, where it will either be reabsorbed or excreted via feces, and all of the vitamin E vitamers are metabolized and then excreted via urine.

Upon reaching the liver, RRR-alpha-tocopherol is preferentially taken up by alpha-tocopherol transfer protein (α-TTP). All other forms are degraded to 2'-carboxethyl-6-hydroxychromane (CEHC), a process that involves truncating the phytic tail of the molecule, then either sulfated or glycuronidated. This renders the molecules water-soluble and leads to excretion via urine. Alpha-tocopherol is also degraded by the same process, to 2,5,7,8-tetramethyl-2-(2'-carboxyethyl)-6-hydroxychromane (α-CEHC), but more slowly because it is partially protected by α-TTP. Large intakes of α-tocopherol result in increased urinary α-CEHC, so this appears to be a means of disposing of excess vitamin E.

Alpha-tocopherol transfer protein is coded by the TTPA gene on chromosome 8. The binding site for RRR-α-tocopherol is a hydrophobic pocket with a lower affinity for beta-, gamma-, or delta-tocopherols, or for the stereoisomers with an S configuration at the chiral 2 site. Tocotrienols are also a poor fit because the double bonds in the phytic tail create a rigid configuration that is a mismatch with the α-TTP pocket. A rare genetic defect of the TTPA gene results in people exhibiting a progressive neurodegenerative disorder known as ataxia with vitamin E deficiency (AVED) despite consuming normal amounts of vitamin E. Large amounts of alpha-tocopherol as a dietary supplement are needed to compensate for the lack of α-TTP The role of α-TTP is to move α-tocopherol to the plasma membrane of hepatocytes (liver cells), where it can be incorporated into newly created very low density lipoprotein (VLDL) molecules. These convey α-tocopherol to cells in the rest of the body. As an example of a result of the preferential treatment, the US diet delivers approximately 70 mg/d of γ-tocopherol and plasma concentrations are on the order of 2–5 µmol/L; meanwhile, dietary α-tocopherol is about 7 mg/d but plasma concentrations are in the range of 11–37 µmol/L.

Affinity of α-TTP for vitamin E vitamers

Testing for levels 
A worldwide summary of more than one hundred human studies reported a median of 22.1 µmol/L for serum α-tocopherol, and defined α-tocopherol deficiency as less than 12 µmol/L. It cited a recommendation that serum α-tocopherol concentration be ≥30 µmol/L to optimize health benefits. In contrast, the U.S. Dietary Reference Intake text for vitamin E concluded that a plasma concentration of 12 µmol/L was sufficient to achieve normal ex vivo hydrogen peroxide-induced hemolysis. A 2014 review defined less than 9 µmol/L as deficient, 9-12 µmol/L as marginal, and greater than 12 µmol/L as adequate.

Serum concentration increases with age. This is attributed to the fact that vitamin E circulates in blood incorporated into lipoproteins, and serum lipoprotein concentrations increase with age. Infants and young children have a higher risk of being below the deficiency threshold. Cystic fibrosis and other fat malabsorption conditions can result in low serum vitamin E. Dietary supplements will raise serum vitamin E.

Research 
For the conditions described below, the results of randomized clinical trials (RCTs) do not always concur with the observational evidence. This could be a matter of amount. Observational studies compare low consumers to high consumers based on intake from food. Diets higher in vitamin E may contain other compounds that convey health benefits, or be consumed by people who make non-diet lifestyle choices that lower disease risk, so that the observed effect may not be due to the vitamin E content. Meanwhile, many of the published RCTs used amounts of alpha-tocopherol 20X to 30X higher than what can be achieved from food.

Declining supplement use 
In the United States, vitamin E supplement use by female health professionals was 16.1% in 1986, 46.2% in 1998, 44.3% in 2002, but decreased to 19.8% in 2006. Similarly, for male health professionals, rates for same years were 18.9%, 52.0%, 49.4% and 24.5%. The authors theorized that declining use in these populations may have been due to publications of studies that showed either no benefits or negative consequences from vitamin E supplements. Within the U.S. military services, vitamin prescriptions written for active, reserve and retired military, and their dependents, were tracked over years 2007–2011. Vitamin E prescriptions decreased by 53% while vitamin C remained constant and vitamin D increased by 454%. A report on vitamin E sales volume in the US documented a 50% decrease between 2000 and 2006, with a potential reason being a meta-analysis that concluded high-dosage (≥400 IU/d for at least 1 year) vitamin E was associated with an increase in all-cause mortality.

All-cause mortality 
Two meta-analyses concluded that as a dietary supplement, vitamin E neither improved nor impaired all-cause mortality. An older meta-analysis had concluded high-dosage (≥400 IU/d for at least 1 year) vitamin E was associated with an increase in all-cause mortality. The authors acknowledged that the cited high-dose trials were often small and performed with people who already had chronic diseases. A meta-analysis of long-term clinical trials reported a non-significant 2% increase in all-cause mortality when alpha-tocopherol was the only supplement used. The same meta-analysis reported a statistically significant 3% increase for results when alpha-tocopherol was used in combination with other nutrients (vitamin A, vitamin C, beta-carotene, selenium).

Age-related macular degeneration 
A Cochrane review reported no change to risk of developing age-related macular degeneration from long-term vitamin E suplementation.

Alzheimer's disease 
An older review of dietary intake studies reported that higher consumption of vitamin E from foods lowered the risk of developing Alzheimer's disease (AD) by 24%. A 2017 Cochrane review reported on vitamin E as a potential dietary benefit for mild cognitive impairment (MCI) and Alzheimer's disease. Based on evidence from one trial in each of the categories, the study found insufficient evidence for supplemental vitamin E to prevent progression from MCI to dementia, but it did indicate slowing of functional decline in people with AD. Given the small number of trials and subjects, the authors recommended further research.  A 2018 meta-analysis found lower vitamin E blood levels in AD people compared to healthy, age-matched people. In 2017, a consensus statement from the British Association for Psychopharmacology concluded that, until further information is available, vitamin E cannot be recommended for treatment or prevention of Alzheimer's disease.

Cancer 
In a 2022 update of an earlier report, the United States Preventive Services Task Force recommended against the use of vitamin E supplements for the prevention of cardiovascular disease or cancer, concluding there was insufficient evidence to assess the balance of benefits and harms, yet also concluding with moderate certainty that there is no net benefit of supplementation.

As for literature on different types of cancer, an inverse relationship between dietary vitamin E and kidney cancer and bladder cancer is seen in observational studies. The risk reduction was 19% when highest and lowest intake groups were compared. The authors concluded that randomized controlled trials (RCTs) are needed. A large study comparing placebo to an all rac-alpha-tocopherol group consuming 400 IU/day reported no difference in bladder cancer cases. An inverse relationship between dietary vitamin E and lung cancer was reported in observational studies. The relative risk reduction was 16% when highest and lowest intake groups were compared. The benefit was progressive as dietary intake increased from 2 mg/day to 16 mg/day. The authors noted that the findings need to be confirmed by prospective studies. One such large trial, which compared 50 mg alpha-tocopherol to placebo in male tobacco smokers, reported no impact on lung cancer. A trial which tracked people who chose to consume a vitamin E dietary supplement reported an increased risk of lung cancer for those consuming more than 215 mg/day.

For prostate cancer, there are also conflicting results. A meta-analysis based on serum alpha-tocopherol content reported an inverse correlation, with the difference between lowest and highest a 21% reduction in relative risk. In contrast, a meta-analysis of observational studies reported no relationship for dietary vitamin E intake. There were also conflicting results from large RCTs. The ATBC trial administered placebo or 50 mg/day alpha-tocopherol to male tobacco smokers for 5 to 8 years and reported a 32% decrease in the incidence of prostate cancer. Conversely, the SELECT trial of selenium and vitamin E for prostate cancer enrolled men ages 55 or older, mostly non-smokers, to consume a placebo or a 400 IU/day dietary supplement. It reported relative risk as a statistically significant 17% higher for the vitamin group.

For colorectal cancer, a systematic review identified RCTs of vitamin E and placebo followed for 7–10 years. There was a non-significant 11% decrease in relative risk. The SELECT trial (men over 55 years, placebo or 400 IU/day) also reported on colorectal cancer. There was a non-significant 3% increase in adenoma occurrence compared to placebo. The Women's Health Study compared placebo to 600 IU of natural-source vitamin E on alternate days for an average of 10.1 years. There were no significant differences for incidences of all types of cancer, cancer deaths, or specifically for breast, lung or colon cancers.

Potential confounding factors are the form of vitamin E used in prospective studies and the amounts. Synthetic, racemic mixtures of vitamin E isomers are not bioequivalent to natural, non-racemic mixtures, yet are widely used in clinical trials and as dietary supplement ingredients. One review reported a modest increase in cancer risk with vitamin E supplementation while stating that more than 90% of the cited clinical trials used the synthetic, racemic form dl-alpha-tocopherol.

Cancer health claims 
The U.S. Food and Drug Administration initiated a process of reviewing and approving food and dietary supplement health claims in 1993. Reviews of petitions results in proposed claims being rejected or approved. If approved, specific wording is allowed on package labels. In 1999, a second process for claims review was created. If there is not a scientific consensus on the totality of the evidence, a Qualified Health Claim (QHC) may be established. The FDA does not "approve" qualified health claim petitions. Instead, it issues a Letter of Enforcement Discretion that includes very specific claim language and the restrictions on using that wording. The first QHCs relevant to vitamin E were issued in 2003: "Some scientific evidence suggests that consumption of antioxidant vitamins may reduce the risk of certain forms of cancer." In 2009, the claims became more specific, allowing that vitamin E might reduce the risk of renal, bladder and colorectal cancers, but with required mention that the evidence was deemed weak and the claimed benefits highly unlikely. A petition to add brain, cervical, gastric and lung cancers was rejected. A further revision, May 2012, allowed that vitamin E may reduce risk of renal, bladder and colorectal cancers, with a more concise qualifier sentence added: "FDA has concluded that there is very little scientific evidence for this claim." Any company product label making the cancer claims has to include a qualifier sentence. 

The European Food Safety Authority (EFSA) reviews proposed health claims for the European Union countries. As of September 2022,, EFSA has not evaluated any vitamin E and cancer prevention claims.

Cataracts 
A meta-analysis from 2015 reported that for studies which reported serum tocopherol, higher serum concentration was associated with a 23% reduction in relative risk of age-related cataracts (ARC), with the effect due to differences in nuclear cataract rather than cortical or posterior subcapsular cataract – the three major classifications of age-related cataracts. However, this article and a second meta-analysis reporting on clinical trials of alpha-tocopherol supplementation reported no statistically significant change to risk of ARC when compared to placebo.

Cardiovascular diseases 
In an 2022 update of an earlier report, the United States Preventive Services Task Force recommended against the use of vitamin E supplements for the prevention of cardiovascular disease or cancer, concluding there was insufficient evidence to assess the balance of benefits and harms, yet also concluding with moderate certainty that there is no net benefit of supplementation.

Research on the effects of vitamin E on cardiovascular disease has produced conflicting results. In theory, oxidative modification of LDL-cholesterol promotes blockages in coronary arteries that lead to atherosclerosis and heart attacks, so vitamin E functioning as an antioxidant would reduce oxidized cholesterol and lower risk of cardiovascular disease. Vitamin E status has also been implicated in the maintenance of normal endothelial cell function of cells lining the inner surface of arteries, anti-inflammatory activity and inhibition of platelet adhesion and aggregation. An inverse relation has been observed between coronary heart disease and the consumption of foods high in vitamin E, and also higher serum concentration of alpha-tocopherol. In one of the largest observational studies, almost 90,000 healthy nurses were tracked for eight years. Compared to those in the lowest fifth for reported vitamin E consumption (from food and dietary supplements), those in the highest fifth were at a 34% lower risk of major coronary disease. The problem with observational studies is that these cannot confirm a relation between the lower risk of coronary heart disease and vitamin E consumption because of confounding factors. Diet higher in vitamin E may also be higher in other, unidentified components that promote heart health, or people choosing such diets may be making other healthy lifestyle choices.

There is some supporting evidence from randomized clinical trials (RCTs). A meta-analysis on the effects of alpha-tocopherol supplementation in RCTs on aspects of cardiovascular health reported that when consumed without any other antioxidant nutrient, the relative risk of heart attack was reduced by 18%. The results were not consistent for all of the individual trials incorporated into the meta-analysis. For example, the Physicians' Health Study II did not show any benefit after 400 IU every other day for eight years, for heart attack, stroke, coronary mortality or all-cause mortality. The HOPE/HOPE-TOO trial, which enrolled people with pre-existing vascular disease or diabetes into a multi-year trial of 400 IU/day, reported a higher risk of heart failure in the alpha-tocopherol group.

The effects of vitamin E supplementation on incidence of stroke were summarized in 2011. There were no significant benefits for vitamin E versus placebo. Subset analysis for ischaemic stroke, haemorrhagic stroke, fatal stroke, non-fatal stroke – all no significant difference in risk. Likewise for subset analysis of natural or synthetic vitamin E, or only above or below 300 IU/day, or whether the enrolled people were healthy or considered to be at higher than normal risk. The authors concluded that there was a lack of clinically important benefit of vitamin E supplementation in the prevention of stroke. One large, multi-year study in which post-menopausal women consumed either placebo or 600 IU of natural-sourced vitamin E on alternate days reported no effect on stroke, but did report a 21% reduction in relative risk of developing a deep vein clot or pulmonary embolism. The beneficial effect was strongest is the subset of women who had a history of a prior thrombotic event or who were genetically coded for clot risk (factor V Leiden or prothrombin mutation).

Cardiovascular health claims 
In 2001, the U.S. Food and Drug Administration rejected proposed health claims for vitamin E and cardiovascular health. The U.S. National Institutes of Health reviewed literature published up to 2008 and concluded "In general, clinical trials have not provided evidence that routine use of vitamin E supplements prevents cardiovascular disease or reduces its morbidity and mortality." The European Food Safety Authority (EFSA) reviews proposed health claims for the European Union countries. In 2010, the EFSA reviewed and rejected claims that a cause and effect relationship has been established between the dietary intake of vitamin E and maintenance of normal cardiac function or of normal blood circulation.

Nonalcoholic fatty liver disease 
Meta-analyses reported that supplemental vitamin E significantly reduced elevated liver enzymes, steatosis, inflammation and fibrosis, suggesting that the vitamin may be useful for treatment of nonalcoholic fatty liver disease (NAFLD) and the more extreme subset known as nonalcoholic steatohepatitis (NASH) in adults, but not in children.

Parkinson's disease 
For Parkinson's disease, there is an observed inverse correlation seen with dietary vitamin E, but no confirming evidence from placebo-controlled clinical trials.

Pregnancy 
Antioxidant vitamins as dietary supplements have been proposed as having benefits if consumed during pregnancy. For the combination of vitamin E with vitamin C supplemented to pregnant women, a Cochrane review concluded that the data do not support vitamin E supplementation – majority of trials alpha-tocopherol at 400 IU/day plus vitamin C at 1,000 mg/day – as being efficacious for reducing risk of stillbirth, neonatal death, preterm birth, preeclampsia or any other maternal or infant outcomes, either in healthy women or those considered at risk for pregnancy complications. The review identified only three small trials in which vitamin E was supplemented without co-supplementation with vitamin C. None of these trials reported any clinically meaningful information.

Topical 
Although there is widespread use of tocopheryl acetate as a topical medication, with claims for improved wound healing and reduced scar tissue, reviews have repeatedly concluded that there is insufficient evidence to support these claims. There are reports of vitamin E-induced allergic contact dermatitis from use of vitamin-E derivatives such as tocopheryl linoleate and tocopherol acetate in skin care products. Incidence is low despite widespread use.

Vaping-associated lung injury 

On 5 September 2019, the US Food and Drug Administration announced that 10 out of 18, or 56% of the samples of vape liquids sent in by states, linked to recent vaping related lung disease outbreak in the United States, tested positive for vitamin E acetate which had been used as a thickening agent by illicit THC vape cartridge manufacturers. On 8 November 2019, the Centers for Disease Control and Prevention identified vitamin E acetate as a very strong culprit of concern in the vaping-related illnesses, but has not ruled out other chemicals or toxicants as possible causes. These findings were based on fluid samples from the lungs of 29 patients with vaping-associated pulmonary injury, which provided direct evidence of vitamin E acetate at the primary site of injury in all the 29 lung fluid samples tested. A review confirmed vitamin E acetate as a causitive agent. Pyrolysis of vitamin E acetate produces a range of toxic gases.

History 
Vitamin E was discovered in 1922 by Herbert McLean Evans and Katharine Scott Bishop and first isolated in a pure form by Evans and Gladys Anderson Emerson in 1935 at the University of California, Berkeley. Because the vitamin activity was first identified as a dietary fertility factor in rats, it was given the name "tocopherol" from the Greek words "τόκος" [tókos, birth], and "φέρειν", [phérein, to bear or carry] meaning in sum "to carry a pregnancy," with the ending "-ol" signifying its status as a chemical alcohol. George M. Calhoun, Professor of Greek at the University of California, was credited with helping with the naming process. Erhard Fernholz elucidated its structure in 1938 and shortly afterwards the same year, Paul Karrer and his team first synthesized it.

Nearly 50 years after the discovery of vitamin E an editorial in the Journal of the American Medical Association titled "Vitamin in search of a disease" read in part "...research revealed many of the vitamin's secrets, but no certain therapeutic use and no definite deficiency disease in man." The animal discovery experiments had been a requirement for successful pregnancy, but no benefits were observed for women prone to miscarriage. Evidence for vascular health was characterized as unconvincing. The editorial closed with mention of some preliminary human evidence for protection against hemolytic anemia in young children.

A role for vitamin E in coronary heart disease was first proposed in 1946 by Evan Shute and colleagues. More cardiovascular work from the same research group followed, including a proposal that megadoses of vitamin E could slow down and even reverse the development of atherosclerosis. However, a 2004 meta-analysis showed no association between vitamin E supplementation and cardiovascular events (nonfatal stroke or myocardial infarction) or cardiovascular mortality. There is a long history of belief that topical application of vitamin E containing oil benefits burn and wound healing. This belief persists even though scientific reviews repeatedly refuted this claim.

The role of vitamin E in infant nutrition has a long research history. From 1949 onward there were trials with premature infants suggesting that oral alpha-tocopherol was protective against edema, intracranial hemorrhage, hemolytic anemia and retrolental fibroplasia. A 2003 Cochrane review concluded that vitamin E supplementation in preterm infants reduced the risk of intercranial hemorrhage and retinopathy, but noted an increased risk of sepsis.

References

External links 
 
 

 
Heterocyclic compounds with 2 rings
Food antioxidants
Oxygen heterocycles